The Oum ed Diab Member is a middle-upper Albian geologic member, part of the Ain el Guettar Formation of Tunisia. Dinosaur remains are among the fossils that have been recovered from the formation.

Vertebrate fauna

Fish 

 Caturus sp.
 Onchopristis dunklei
 Hybodus sp.
 Lepidotes sp.

Archosaurs 
 an indeterminate crocodyliform
 the giant pholidosaurid Sarcosuchus
 notosuchian uruguaysuchid Araripesuchus sp.
 an indeterminate ornithocheirid pterosaur
 an indeterminate abelisaurid
 an indeterminate carcharodontosaurid
 teeth referred to Spinosaurus and/or possibly Spinosaurinae
 the rebbachisaurid sauropod Tataouinea as well as indeterminate teeth
 an indeterminate iguanodontian

See also 
 List of dinosaur-bearing rock formations
 Geology of Tunisia

References

Bibliography

Further reading 
 J. Le Loeuff, É. Buffetaut, G. Cuny, Y. Laurent, M. Ouaja, C. Souillat, D. Srarfi and H. Tong. 2000. Mesozoic continental vertebrates of Tunisia. 5th European Workshop on Vertebrate Palaeontology, Staatliches Museum für Naturkunde, Geowissenschaften Abteilung. Program. Abstracts. Excursion Guides 45

Geologic formations of Tunisia
Lower Cretaceous Series of Africa
Albian Stage
Aptian Stage
Sandstone formations
Shallow marine deposits
Paleontology in Tunisia
Tataouine Governorate